The Uzbekistan women's national field hockey team represents Uzbekistan in women's international field hockey competitions and is controlled by the Uzbekistan Hockey Federation, the governing body for field hockey in Uzbekistan.

Tournament record

Asian Games
 1994 – 5th place
 1998 – 5th place
 2022 – Qualified

Asia Cup
 1993 – 5th place

AHF Cup
 2016 – 7th place

See also
 Uzbekistan men's national field hockey team

References

Asian women's national field hockey teams
Field hockey
National team